Chorda is a genus of thalloid brown algae including two species. It is the only genus in the family Chordaceae. Its members are known by a number of common names including: mermaid's fishing line, tsurumo, ruálach, doruithe briain, sea laces, mermaids line, roccálach, ruadhálach, gemeine meersaite, bootlace weed, seatwine, zottige meersaite, dead men's ropes, mermaid's tresses, cat gut and sea lace.

Species 

The  valid species currently considered to belong to this genus are:
Chorda filum
Chorda rigida

References

External links 
 
Images of Chorda at Algaebase

Laminariales
Laminariales genera